Sud-Ubangi (French for "South Ubangi") is one of the 21 new provinces of the Democratic Republic of the Congo created in the 2015 repartitioning. It lies in the northwest of the country on the Ubangi River.

Sud-Ubangi, Équateur, Mongala, Nord-Ubangi, and Tshuapa provinces are the result of the dismemberment of the former Équateur province. Sud-Ubangi was formed from the Sud-Ubangi district and the independently administered city of Zongo.  The town of Gemena was elevated to capital city of the new province.

Administration
The capital of Sud-Ubangi is the town of Gemena.
The separately administered city of Zongo was to be capital of the new province.

The territories of the province are: 
 Budjala
 Gemena
 Kungu
 Libenge

References

 
Provinces of the Democratic Republic of the Congo